Rob Brzezinski is an American football executive who is the executive vice president of football operations for the Minnesota Vikings of the National Football League (NFL). Brzezinski has previously held various roles with the Vikings since 1999.

Early life and education

Brzezinski earned degrees from Nova Southeastern University in Fort Lauderdale, a Juris Doctor in 1995 and a Bachelor of Science in education in 1992. In addition, Brzezinski is a member of the Florida Bar.

Executive career

Miami Dolphins
In 1993, Brzezinski was hired by the Miami Dolphins as a staff counsel and salary cap manager. He would go on to serve in this role for six seasons (1993–1998).

Minnesota Vikings
In 1999, Brzezinski was hired by the Minnesota Vikings as their director of football administration. In 2001, he was promoted to vice president of football administration. Brzezinski was promoted to executive vice president of football operations.

Personal life
Brzezinski is married to Leah, who has earned a doctoral degree in education. They have 6 children: Ki, Grace, Lydia, Jae, Anna, and Rose. The Brzezinski family founded Arete Academy (www.areteacademymn.org) in 2014, a school in Minnesota dedicated to educating students who are twice exceptional and are active in the community raising awareness for adoption-related causes..

References

Year of birth missing (living people)
Living people
Miami Dolphins executives
Minnesota Vikings executives
Nova Southeastern University alumni